The 2022 RAN Women's Sevens Qualifiers are a North American rugby sevens tournament that took place at the Thomas Robinson Stadium, Nassau on April 23 and 24, 2022; they were held in The Bahamas for the third time. Owing to the postponement of the 2022 RAN Women's Super Sevens (originally scheduled to be held in Mexico City during February 2022), this event was created specifically to maintain a qualification pathway to the 2022 Rugby World Cup Sevens, with one place awarded to the winner only.

Five teams participated in the tournament, including 2019 champions Mexico.

Format
All five teams contest a ten-match round-robin over two days, with each team playing four matches. Upon conclusion of the round-robin, the top two teams from the pool advance to the final, while the third/fourth-ranked teams progress to the third-place match.

Teams 
The following five national teams participated:

Pool stage
All times in Eastern Daylight Time (UTC−04:00)

Placement stage
Third place

Final

Final standings

See also
 2021–22 World Rugby Women's Sevens Series

References

External links
 Tournament site

 

2022
Rugby union in the Bahamas
2022 rugby sevens competitions
April 2022 sports events in North America
Women's sport in the Bahamas